José Claudinei Georgini (born 15 December 1947) is a Brazilian football manager nicknamed Valinhos who last managed the Zimbabwe national team, a position he held from January to November 2008.

Career

Playing career
Valinhos only had a brief playing career, playing between 1968 and 1979 with Bonsucesso, Vasco da Gama, Olaria, Goiás, Portuguesa (RJ), Volta Redonda and Serrano.

Management career
He was coach of the Brazil under-20 side between 2001 and 2003 and has also coached in Brazil, the United Arab Emirates, Saudi Arabia, Kuwait and Morocco.

On 12 March 2015, Zimbabwe were expelled from the qualifying tournament for the 2018 FIFA World Cup for failing to pay Claudinei arrears owed.

References

1947 births
Living people
People from Valinhos
Brazilian footballers
Brazilian football managers
Bonsucesso Futebol Clube players
CR Vasco da Gama players
Olaria Atlético Clube players
Goiás Esporte Clube players
Associação Atlética Portuguesa (RJ) players
Volta Redonda FC players
Al-Wasl F.C. managers
Free State Stars F.C. managers
Zimbabwe national football team managers
Association footballers not categorized by position
Footballers from São Paulo (state)